Maronna is an Italian surname. Notable people with the surname include:

Jorge Maronna (born 1948), Argentine musician
Mike Maronna (born 1977), American actor